William Breuninger Johnstone (13 March 1881 – 4 February 1944) was an American writer, cartoonist, and lyricist.

His writing credits include the Marx Brothers's Broadway revue I'll Say She Is and, with S.J. Perelman, their first two Hollywood films, Monkey Business and Horse Feathers. He also wrote several popular songs, including a version of "How Dry I Am", a part of which plagiarizes Rudyard Kipling's "Mandalay."

He created the cartoon character of 'The Tax Payer' wearing only a barrel held up by suspenders. It was a regular feature in the New York World-Telegram. Johnstone also created the comic strip You Know Me Al (distributed by the Bell Syndicate).

References

Further reading

Books with contributions by Johnstone

External links
 
 

1881 births
1943 deaths
American cartoonists
American comics artists
American lyricists
Songwriters from Missouri
20th-century American screenwriters